The Asian-Pacific Postal Union (APPU) was formed (in its current form) by International treaty through an Asian-Pacific Postal Convention signed in Yogyakarta on .  The organisation has origins dating back to 1961.

The purpose of the union is to extend, facilitate and improve the postal relations and promote cooperation in the field of the postal services between the member-countries; currently 32.

APPU is a Restricted Union as defined by Article 8 of the Universal Postal Union, serving to coordinate postal services in the region.

Asian-Pacific Postal College
APPU also runs the Asian-Pacific Postal College (APPC) founded in 1970 supporting the training and development of member states' postal staff. The APPC is also based in Bangkok, Thailand.

References

Treaties of Afghanistan
Treaties of Australia
Treaties of Bangladesh
Treaties of Bhutan
Treaties of Brunei
Treaties of Cambodia
Treaties of China
Treaties of Fiji
Treaties of India
Treaties of Indonesia
Treaties of Iran
Treaties of Japan
Treaties of South Korea
Treaties of Laos
Treaties of Malaysia
Treaties of the Maldives
Treaties of Mongolia
Treaties of Myanmar
Treaties of Nauru
Treaties of Nepal
Treaties of New Zealand
Treaties of Pakistan
Treaties of Papua New Guinea
Treaties of the Philippines
Treaties of Samoa
Treaties of Singapore
Treaties of the Solomon Islands
Treaties of Sri Lanka
Treaties of Thailand
Treaties of Tonga
Treaties of Vanuatu
Treaties of Vietnam
International organizations based in Thailand